Buthus occitanus, the common yellow scorpion, is a species of scorpion in the family Buthidae. It occurs in the Middle East, North Africa and Europe.

B. occitanus is 60–80 mm in length, has a yellow or yellow-brown color and is venomous producing BotIT6 toxin, but its toxicity varies markedly across its range. This scorpion is often found in dry and hot areas with sparse vegetation, where it hides under stones etc. during daytime. It has also been reported from Mediterranean forests in Spain at altitudes above 1000 meters (with snowfall in the winter). The sting in Europe is painful but with only mild toxic effects, however, in Africa it can be fatal.

References

Buthidae
Animals described in 1789
Scorpions of Africa
Scorpions of Europe